This is a list of wars involving the Kingdom of Bahrain and its predecessor states.

List

See also
 Conflicts not considered as wars:
 1990s uprising in Bahrain
 Bahraini uprising (2011–present)

References

 
Bahrain
Military history of Bahrain
Wars